The 2017 Asian Youth Athletics Championships was the second edition of the biennial, continental athletics competition for Asian athletes aged fifteen to seventeen. It was held at the National Stadium in Bangkok, Thailand from 20–23 May. Organised by the Athletics Association of Thailand, a total of forty events were contested with the events divided evenly between the sexes. The event programme mirrored that of the previous IAAF World Youth Championships in Athletics, with the exception of a boy's decathlon, rather than the octathlon.

China comfortably topped the medal table (as it did in 2015) with sixteen gold medals and 30 medals in total (a quarter of those on offer). Its dominance was slanted towards the girls' events, with Chinese topping 13 of the 20 women's podiums. Chinese Taipei retained its position of next best with six golds in a total of fifteen, closely followed by India on five golds in a 14-medal haul.

Feng Lulu was the outstanding athlete of the meet, taking the girls' 100 metres and 200 metres before claiming the sprint medley relay title with the Chinese team, resulting in three championship records. Her compatriot Pan Youqi was the triple jump winner as well as long jump runner-up. Hong Kong's Chan Pui Kei was the only other athlete to claim three medals, being twice runner-up to Feng individually and taking third in the relay. Guo Pei Yu was a minor medallist in both shot put and discus throw events. Halomoan Edwin Binsar was the only male athlete to reach two individual podiums, being the 400 metres hurdles champion and 110 metres hurdles bronze medallist.

The regional event preceded the 2017 World U18 Championships in Athletics, where several Chinese athletes went on to global success. Liu Zhekai was the boy's javelin throw winner there and on the girls side Niu Chunge and Gong Luying also won the pole vault and long jump titles, respectively. Zhang Yao, third in the racewalk in Bangkok, improved to take the world under-18 gold. Among the world minor medallists were boy's hammer thrower Damneet Singh and Taipei hurdler Lu Hao-hua.2017 IAAF World U18 Championships Results. IAAF. Retrieved 2018-01-28.

Medal summary

Men

 Mathew was declared the winner in a photo finish, being given a time of 1:54.991, two thousandths ahead of Mudiyansela
 Shin Mink-yu of Korea set a championship record of 21.45 seconds in the preliminary rounds.
 Hao Hua Lu of Chinese Taipei set a championship record of 13.40 seconds in the preliminary rounds.

Women

Medal table
Key

See also
2017 World Youth Championships in Athletics
2017 African Youth Athletics Championships

References

Results
2nd Asian Youth Athletics Championships 2017 - Summary Result. Athletics Asia. Retrieved 2018-01-28.

Asian Youth Athletics Championships
International athletics competitions hosted by Thailand
Sport in Bangkok
Asian Youth Athletics Championships
Asian Youth Athletics Championships
Asian Youth Athletics Championships
Asian Athletics Championships